Rugby sevens at the 1998 Commonwealth Games was the first Commonwealth Games where rugby sevens was played. It was at the time one of the male-only sports at the Commonwealth Games.

The gold medal was won by New Zealand who defeated Fiji 21–12 in the final on 14 September 1998. In the bronze medal playoff Australia defeated Samoa 33–12. Gambia and Zimbabwe withdrew before the tournament started, resulting in a re-draw of the first round matches and groups.

Pool stage

First phase

Second phase

Final standings

Knockout stages

Cup

Plate & Bowl

Medallists

References

External links

rugby sevens
1998
International rugby union competitions hosted by Malaysia
1998 rugby sevens competitions